Sterol O-acyltransferase (acyl-Coenzyme A: cholesterol acyltransferase) 1, also known as SOAT1, is an enzyme that in humans is encoded by the SOAT1 gene.

Function 

Acyl-coenzyme A:cholesterol acyltransferase is an intracellular protein located in the endoplasmic reticulum that forms cholesterol esters from cholesterol. Accumulation of cholesterol esters as cytoplasmic lipid droplets within macrophages and smooth muscle cells is a characteristic feature of the early stages of atherosclerotic plaques (Cadigan et al., 1988).

Structure and biogenesis 
SOAT1 is a polytopic integral membrane protein belonging to the membrane-bound O-acyltransferase (MBOAT) superfamily. The structure of SOAT1 has not yet been solved but that of DltB, a bacterial MBOAT, suggests a complex arrangement of multiple transmembrane domains (TMDs). Primary sequences of predicted SOAT1 TMDs indicate many unusual TMD features such as the presence of multiple charged residues within the lipid bilayer. These features can render challenging the integration of a TMD into the hydrophobic phase of the membrane and might therefore require specialised chaperones. A first hint of such a chaperone assisting SOAT1 biogenesis has been the recognition of the involvement of the ER membrane protein complex (EMC), a molecular chaperone and insertase for integral membrane proteins, in maintaining SOAT1 stability.

Interactive pathway map

See also 
 Acyl-CoA:cholesterol acyltransferase

References

Further reading